The Toronto Carrying-Place Trail, also known as the Humber Portage and the Toronto Passage, was a major portage route in Ontario, Canada, linking Lake Ontario with Lake Simcoe and the northern Great Lakes. The name comes from the Mohawk term toron-ten, meaning "the place where the trees grow over the water", an important landmark on Lake Simcoe through which the trail passed.

Route

From Lake Ontario, the trail ran northward along the eastern bank of the Humber River. It forked at Woodbridge, with one path crossing the east branch of the Humber and running along the west side of the river to the vicinity of Kleinburg, where it crossed the river again. This trail was probably used during the seasons when the water was low enough to ford.

A second route of the trail runs from Lake Ontario at the Rouge River, following the river northwest to the Oak Ridges Moraine. Crossing the Moraine it met the eastern branch of the Holland River near Aurora, Ontario. This arm appears to have been favoured by the French explorers in the area, without ever having seen the Humber arm. Near the mouth of the Rouge River, the Seneca had established a village by the name of Ganatsekwyagon. The Bead Hill site in Rouge Park is believed to contain the archaeological remains of the village. 

Once into Lake Simcoe, known as Ouentironk among the First Nations people living in the area, the trail continues north through straits on the north end of the lake into Lake Couchiching. These straits, an important fishing area, gave rise to the name Toronto, as this is "the place where the trees grow over the water". The First Nations peoples had planted trees in the narrows between the lakes to act as a weir to catch fish. From there the trail follows the Severn River into Georgian Bay. Many of the major First Nations tribes lived in the area around and to the north of Lake Simcoe, which were easily reachable via the many rivers leading to the lake.

It is widely stated that the first European to see the Humber arm was Étienne Brûlé, who traveled it with a group of twelve Huron in 1615. However it is now believed that this is in error, and he actually traveled further west, to Lake Erie.

Further French settlement used the Humber portion of the trail primarily. Near the mouth of the Humber and along the Toronto Passage was a trading post called Teiaiagon, where the French and English met with the locals for trading. The site is marked with a plaque and is near the heritage Old Mill Inn. This included the construction of three forts on or near the trail. The second, Fort Toronto, was built in 1750 only a few hundred metres north of the lake, right on the trail.

The trail was widely used by both French and English fur traders until Toronto started to be permanently settled in the early 19th century, bringing to a close over a millennium of use. The connection north to Lake Simcoe was then made along Yonge Street, constructed after Simcoe followed the eastern branch into Toronto.

See also
 Great Indian Warpath
 Name of Toronto

References

External links

 - map showing the western arm as it was when Yonge Street was being laid out.
 - part of a lengthy article on the Humber, this section contains a map of the southern portions of the trail.

History of Toronto
Portages in Canada
Historic trails and roads in Ontario
History of transport in the Regional Municipality of York